"2/Catorce" is a song recorded by Puerto Rican singer Rauw Alejandro and Puerto Rican producer Mr. Naisgai for Alejandro's second studio album, Vice Versa (2021). It was written by Alejandro, while the production was handled by Mr. Naisgai. The song was released for digital download and streaming by Sony Music Latin and Duars Entertainment on February 14, 2021, as the lead single from the album. A Spanish language Urbano Latin R&B song, it is about passionate and sexual moments as a couple, and situations where the temperature rises.

"2/Catorce" received positive reviews from music critics, who described it as sensual. The track was commercially successful, reaching number one in Dominican Republic, as well as the top 15 in several other countries such as Argentina and Spain, and on Billboards Hot Latin Songs in the United States. The song has received several certifications, including double platinum in Mexico. An accompanying music video, released simultaneously with the song, was filmed in Medellín and directed by Eric Duars and Alejandro.

Background and release
Rauw Alejandro released his debut studio album, Afrodisíaco on November 13, 2020. Two weeks after finishing the work on Afrodisíaco, he started working on his second studio album, Vice Versa. In February 2022, while he was in Medellín, he recorded "2/Catorce" along with producer Mr. Naisgai. On February 14, 2021, coinciding with Valentine's Day, the song was surprise-released for digital download and streaming by Sony Music Latin and Duars Entertainment as the lead single from Vice Versa. Alejandro explained to his followers on Instagram:

He explained about releasing the song without previous planning, stating that he thinks "it doesn't have to be good, it has to feel good", expressing that "art is relative". The song was later included as the fifth track on Alejandro's second studio album, Vice Versa, released June 25, 2021.

Music and lyrics

Musically, "2/Catorce" is a Spanish language Urbano Latin R&B song, written by Alejandro and produced by Mr. Naisgai. The track runs for a total of 3 minutes and 32 seconds. Lyrically, "2/Catorce" which translates to "2/Fourteen" in English, is about passionate and sexual moments as a couple, and situations where the temperature rises. The lyrics include, "Qué suerte que soy yo el que puede comerte / ¿Qué hice para merecerte? / Cada día que pasa lo que siento es má' fuerte / Solo quiero verte" (How lucky that I am the one who can eat you / What did I do to deserve you? / Every day that passes what I feel becomes stronger / I just want to see you).

Critical reception
Upon release, "2/Catorce" was met with widely positive reviews from music critics. Sónica.mx critic Armando Tovar gave it a positive review, saying it "dominated the trends of social networks" and "raised the temperature among his followers". Writing for Los 40, Jimena Garrido De Castro labeled the track a "gem", and Happyfm staff praised it as an "authentic bomb". Maliah West and Sabrina Sanchez from Sidekick described the song as "smooth" and "sensual", while Latinas Lucas Villa named it "one of the sexiest songs" in Alejandro's discography. In her review for Teen Vogue, Alexis Hodoyan-Gastelum compared it with Alejandro's hit song "Todo de Ti", stating that "2/Catorce" is "mellow" and "sexier". In 2022, Ernesto Lechner from Rolling Stone ranked the track as the singer's 27th-best song, describing its production as "lovely", saying it envelopes Alejandro's "voice in gauzy synths and a nimble downbeat".

Accolades
In 2022, Fucsia ranked "2/Catorce" among "The 10 Best Reggaeton Songs For A Moment Of Passion With Your Partner".

Commercial performance
"2/Catorce" is one of Alejandro's most commercially successful songs in his career, peaking at number 43 on the Billboard Global 200. The song debuted at number 46 on the US Billboard Hot Latin Songs chart on May 29, 2021, becoming Alejandro's 15th entry. The following week, coinciding with the success of "Todo de Ti", "2/Catorce" climbed to number 26. Following the release of Vice Versa, the song reached its peak of number 11. The song was certified platinum (Latin) by the Recording Industry Association of America (RIAA), for track-equivalent sales of over 60,000 units in the United States. In Spain, "2/Catorce" peaked at number 12 and was certified double platinum by the Productores de Música de España (PROMUSICAE), for track-equivalent sales of over 80,000 units in the country. The track reached number one in Dominican Republic, and number three in Nicaragua. It also peaked in the top 20 of Argentina, Colombia, and Paraguay. In Mexico, the song was certified double platinum by the Asociación Mexicana de Productores de Fonogramas y Videogramas (AMPROFON), for track-equivalent sales of over 280,000 units.

Promotion

Music video

An accompanying music video was released simultaneously with the song. The visual was filmed in Medellín and directed by Eric Duars and Alejandro. It depicts Alejandro standing alone and singing on a rooftop, while the pink sky surrounds him, while he overlooks "the icy city below". In her review for Los 40, Jimena Garrido De Castro described it as "simple but colorful".

Live performances
The song was included on the set lists for Alejandro's the Rauw Alejandro World Tour and the Vice Versa Tour.

Track listing

Credits and personnel
Credits adapted from Tidal.
 Rauw Alejandro associated performer, composer, lyricist
 Mr. Naisgai associated performer, producer
 José M. Collazo "Colla" mastering engineer, mixing engineer
 Jorge E. Pizarro "Kenobi" recording engineer

Charts

Weekly charts

Monthly charts

Year-end charts

Certifications

Release history

See also
 2021 in Latin music

Footnotes

References

2021 songs
2021 singles
Rauw Alejandro songs
Songs written by Rauw Alejandro
Sony Music Latin singles
Spanish-language songs